Richard Peter Lovato Jr. (born September 9, 1992) is an American football long snapper for the Philadelphia Eagles of the National Football League (NFL). He played college football at Old Dominion. Lovato was signed by the Chicago Bears as an undrafted free agent in 2015. He has also played for the Green Bay Packers and Washington Redskins.

Early years
Lovato was born in Neptune Township, New Jersey, the son of Rick and Maureen Lovato. He attended Middletown High School South in Middletown, New Jersey, where he started long snapping as a freshman. He also saw time at center and on the defensive line.

College career
Lovato played college football for the Old Dominion Monarchs football team from 2011 to 2014. He appeared in all 50 games as the Monarchs’ long snapper.

Professional career

Chicago Bears
After going undrafted in the 2015 NFL Draft, Lovato signed with the Chicago Bears on May 3, 2015. On August 30, 2015, he was released by the Bears.

Green Bay Packers
On December 22, 2015, Lovato was signed by the Green Bay Packers after starting long snapper Brett Goode suffered a season-ending knee injury. Prior to being signed, he was working at a sandwich shop in Lincroft, New Jersey owned by his father and uncle. Lovato became the first Old Dominion alumnus to play in a regular-season NFL game after handling snapping duties for every punt and field goal against the Arizona Cardinals in Week 16. On September 3, 2016, he was released by the Packers during final team cuts.

Washington Redskins
On November 19, 2016, Lovato was signed by the Washington Redskins to fill in for the injured Nick Sundberg. He was released on November 29, 2016.

Philadelphia Eagles

On December 12, 2016, Lovato was signed by the Philadelphia Eagles after starting long snapper Jon Dorenbos suffered a broken wrist.

Lovato earned the Eagles long snapping job in 2017 after the team traded away Dorenbos. Lovato would go on to win Super Bowl LII with the Eagles.

On November 19, 2019, Lovato signed a four-year contract extension with the Eagles through the 2024 season. He was selected to the Pro Bowl on December 17, 2019.

On October 25, 2021, Lovato was waived by the Eagles following the waiver claim of Reid Sinnett. Lovato re-signed to the Eagles' 53-man roster the following day.

In 2022, Lovato reached his second career Super Bowl. The Eagles lost 38-35 to the Kansas City Chiefs.

References

External links

 
 Old Dominion Monarchs bio
 

1992 births
Living people
Middletown High School South alumni
Players of American football from New Jersey
People from Middletown Township, New Jersey
Sportspeople from Monmouth County, New Jersey
American football long snappers
Old Dominion Monarchs football players
Chicago Bears players
Green Bay Packers players
Washington Redskins players
Philadelphia Eagles players
National Conference Pro Bowl players